U12 minor spliceosomal RNA is formed from U12 small nuclear (snRNA), together with U4atac/U6atac, U5, and U11 snRNAs and associated proteins, forms a spliceosome that cleaves a divergent class of low-abundance pre-mRNA introns. Although the U12 sequence is very divergent from that of U2, the two are functionally analogous.

Structure 
The predicted secondary structure of U12 RNA is published,. However, the alternative single hairpin in the 3' end shown here seems to better match the alignment of divergent Drosophila melanogaster and Arabidopsis thaliana sequences. The sequences U12 introns that are spliced out are collected in a biological database called the U12 intron database.

References

External links 
 

Small nuclear RNA
Spliceosome
RNA splicing